This paleomammalogy list records new  fossil mammal taxa that were described during the year 2014, as well as notes other significant paleomammalogy discoveries and events which occurred during that year.

Non-eutherian mammals

Metatherians

Others

Newly named eutherians

Xenarthrans

Afrotherians

Bats

Odd-toed ungulates

Even-toed ungulates

Cetaceans

Carnivorans

Rodents

Primates and plesiadapiforms

Others

References

2010s in paleontology
Mammals
Prehistoric mammals